USS Tennessee, originally USS Madawaska, was a screw frigate built of wood at the New York Navy Yard in Brooklyn, New York, and launched as Madawaska on 8 July 1865. Powered by two Ericsson vibrating-lever engines, Madawaska departed New York City for sea trials 14 January 1867, Commander Francis A. Roe in command. Remaining at sea for one week, she steamed nearly 1,000 nautical miles (1,150 statute miles; 1,852 km) before returning when her supply of coal was exhausted.

She was renamed Tennessee 15 May 1869 and timbered up to the necessary height to allow a spar deck to be installed. She was fitted with new compound back‑acting engines capable of developing . She carried 380 tons of coal but was also rigged for sail, the area of her 10 principal sails being .

Her duties included service as flagship of the Asiatic Squadron under Rear Admiral William Reynolds, with Captain William W. Low in command. By 1879 she was flagship of the North Atlantic Squadron under Rear Admiral Robert W. Wyman, with Captain David B. Harmony in command. On 15 February 1881 at New Orleans, Louisiana, Seaman George Low jumped overboard and rescued a fellow sailor from drowning, for which he was awarded the Medal of Honor.

In The Steam Navy of the United States, Frank M. Bennet relates that during the time Tennessee was flagship of the North Atlantic Squadron she was "the largest vessel then in commission in the American Navy, and the era of mastless steel cruisers was yet so far away that she was not suspected, by the youngsters at least, of being obsolete and stood as the type of all that was excellent and majestic in ship construction." Her spaciousness and the comfort of her quarters as well as her handling characteristics made her a favorite duty station.

Tennessee was sold on 15 September 1886 to Burdett Pond of Meriden, Connecticut.

See also

List of steam frigates of the United States Navy
Bibliography of American Civil War naval history
Union Navy
Confederate States Navy

References 

 (USS Madawaska)
 (USS Tennessee)

Ships built in Brooklyn
1865 ships
Steamships of the United States Navy